Jared Taylor is a former France international rugby league footballer who played for the Pia Donkeys in the Elite One Championship. Lézignan Sangliers in the Elite One Championship.

Background
Taylor was born in Australia.

Career
In 2008 he was named in the France squad for the 2008 Rugby League World Cup.

References

1981 births
Living people
Australian rugby league players
Baroudeurs de Pia XIII players
Cronulla-Sutherland Sharks players
France national rugby league team players
Lézignan Sangliers players
Limoux Grizzlies players
Rugby league fullbacks
Rugby league wingers
South Sydney Rabbitohs players
Villefranche XIII Aveyron players